Eriocottis nicolaeella is a moth in the family Eriocottidae. It was described by Christian Gibeaux in 1983. It is found in France and Spain.

References

Moths described in 1983
Eriocottidae
Moths of Europe